Maracas–Saint Joseph is a colloquial name used in Trinidad and Tobago to distinguish the Maracas Valley above the town of Saint Joseph from Maracas Beach.  Maracas–Saint Joseph is one of the large valleys on the southern side of the Northern Range, while Maracas Beach lies on the opposite side of the mountains.

It is known for its scenic views and lush greenery. The valley is a favourite for birdwatching among amateur and seasoned birdwatchers alike, especially hummingbirds at the Yerretê hummingbird attraction. Hiking is also a well-participated recreation within the valley with its two main hikes are to the Maracas Waterfall and the more high-level endurance hike over El Tucuche mountain to Maracas Bay. Also, there exists a variety of estates available for events such as weddings. This includes the Ortinola Estate, La Solidad, and the Santa Barbara Estate.

Lying north of the old capital of Spanish Trinidad, the valley was one of the first areas to be settled in Trinidad.  The Maracas Royal Road, which runs up the valley, is one of the oldest roads in the country.  It is drained by the Saint Joseph River,(also called Maracas River) a major tributary of the Caroni River.  The lower parts of the valley are rapidly being developed for upscale housing.  The former President of Trinidad and Tobago, George Maxwell Richards, is among the residents of the valley.

Maracas Valley is also home to the country's oldest tertiary institution, the University of the Southern Caribbean. This University is a private institution of higher learning, owned and operated by the Seventh-day Adventist Church. It has been in existence for over 90 years. Another tertiary institution that operates within the Valley is the West- Indian School of Theology, which is owned and operated by the Pentecostal Assembly of the West Indies (PAWI). There are also 3 Primary schools within the Valley that operated by various denominations. They are Maracas Seventh-day Adventist Primary School, Maracas Presbyterian Primary School, and Maracas Roman Catholic Primary School.
 
Maracas Valley consists of a collection of developments, gated and not gated. Some of the older developments include Valley View, Mountain View, La Baja Heights, Mira Flores, Avondale Gardens and Poolside( One and two). More recently, the Maracas Gardens, Sarame Gardens, Acono Ridge and Alta Garcia Gardens have been developed. These communities tend to consist of one to four-story homes, built a variety of eye-catching designs.

 Landforms of Trinidad and Tobago
 Valleys of North America